Events in the year 1829 in Art.

Events
November – Thomas Hornor's Panoramic view of London, the largest panoramic painting ever created, is completed in the London Colosseum, purpose-designed by Decimus Burton in Regent's Park.
December – The final issue of The Yankee magazine by art critic John Neal is published.
Jean-Hippolyte Flandrin and his brother Jean Paul Flandrin set out to walk to Paris from Lyons, in order to become pupils of Louis Hersent.

Works

Paintings
John Constable – Hadleigh Castle
William Etty – Benaiah
Christen Købke – View of Århus Cathedral
Cornelis Kruseman – Portrait of Johannes van den Bosch
Edwin Henry Landseer – An Illicit Whisky Still in the Highlands
Bernardo López Piquer – Maria Isabel of Braganza
J. M. W. Turner – Ulysses Deriding Polyphemus
David Wilkie – George IV in Highland dress

Sculpture
Francis Chantrey – Bust of John Soane
John Hogan – The Dead Christ
Carlo Marochetti – Young Girl Playing with a Dog
Robert Mills – Washington Monument (Baltimore)

Births
February 20 – Charles-Auguste Lebourg, French sculptor (died 1906)
March 1 – Adolf Seel, German painter (died 1907)
March 5 – Jean-Jacques Henner, French painter (died 1905)
June 8 – John Everett Millais, English painter (died 1896)
July 18 – Paul Dubois, French sculptor and painter (died 1905)
July 25 – Elizabeth Siddal, English Pre-Raphaelite artists' model, painter and poet (died 1862)
August 19 – Edward Moran, American marine painter (died 1901)
September 12 – Anselm Feuerbach, German classicist painter (died 1880)
September 16 – Achille Emperaire, French painter and friend of Paul Cézanne (died 1898)
November 20 – Albert Fitch Bellows, American landscape painter (died 1883)
date unknown – John Lewis Brown, French painter (died 1892)

Deaths
January 6 – Louis Gerverot, French porcelain painter (born 1747)
February 4 – Pierre Charles Baquoy, French painter and engraver especially of famous historical characters (born 1759)
March 21 – George Engleheart, English miniaturist (born 1752)
March 24 – Jean-Jacques Karpff, French painter, designer and miniaturist (born 1770)
May 24 – Michał Ceptowski, Bavarian-born stucco artist who settled and worked in Poland (born 1765)
June 25 – Joseph Bergler the Younger, Austrian-born painter and etcher who settled and worked in Bohemia (born 1753)
July 14 – Joseph Kreutzinger, Austrian portrait painter (born 1757)
September 22 – Jes Bundsen, Danish architectural and landscape painter and etcher (born 1766)
September 27 – Pietro Bettelini, Italian engraver (born 1763)
November 12 – Jean-Baptiste Regnault, French painter (born 1754)
 date unknown
 Nikolai Ivanovich Argunov, Russian painter and academician of the St. Petersburg Academy of arts (born 1771)
 Joseph-François Ducq, Flemish historical and portrait painter (born 1763)
 Joseph Farey, English mechanical engineer and draughtsman (born 1796)
 Gai Qi, Chinese poet and painter (born 1774)
 Zhang Yin, Chinese Qing dynasty calligrapher and painter (born 1761)

References

 
Years of the 19th century in art
1820s in art